Put chai ko is a popular snack in Hong Kong. The pudding cake is palm size and is sweet in taste. It is soft, but can hold its molded shape outside a bowl. The cake is made from white or brown sugar, long-grain rice flour with a little wheat starch or cornstarch. Sometimes red beans are also added. The batter is poured into porcelain bowls and steamed until cooked through. Then it is allowed to cool and served at room temperature. Traditionally, the hawker inserts two bamboo skewers into the cake to turn it out and the eater holds the skewers to consume. At present, most Put Chai Ko are sold in plastic bags.

Names
The snack is also known by a number of English names, including Put chai pudding, Rice Pudding, Earthen bowl cake, Bootjaigo, Red bean pudding or Put chai ko.

History
The pudding is made like other traditional Cantonese steamed cakes. The pudding reached its popularity peak in the early to mid-1980s when hawkers sold it all over the streets in their push carts. At the time, there were only a small handful of flavors. One of the dish's cultural trademarks is that it is served in a porcelain bowl or an aluminium cup. The snack is still available today in select Chinese pastry or snack shops, or from street hawkers. The pudding can also be served like an ice pop, held up by two bamboo sticks.

Classic Hong Kong flavors
 Plain white sugar
 Brown sugar
 Plain white sugar with azuki beans
 Brown sugar with any one of the beans in the genus Vigna

See also
 Egg tart
 List of steamed foods
 Uirō - Japanese Wagashi

References

External links
Put chai ko recipe 
Put chai ko recipe 

Snack foods
Hong Kong cuisine
Puddings
Chinese desserts
Steamed foods
Cantonese cuisine
Rice cakes